Monomoy Island is an  spit of sand extending southwest from Chatham, Cape Cod off the Massachusetts mainland.  Because of shifting sands and water levels, it is often connected to the mainland, and at other times is separated from it.  It is home to the Monomoy National Wildlife Refuge. It is referred to in the 1691 Massachusetts Charter as Cape Mallabar, also spelled Cape Malabar.

History 

Despite its remoteness, Monomoy was home to its own community as early as 1710. A tavern for sailors was opened up in the location of today's Hospital Pond, known then as Wreck Cove.

During the early 19th century, a deep natural harbor at Monomoy's inner shore known as the Powder Hole attracted a sizeable fishing settlement. In its prime, Whitewash Village housed about 200 residents, a tavern inn called Monomoit House, and Public School #13, which boasted 16 students at one time. Cod and mackerel brought in to the Monomoy port were dried and packed for markets in Boston and New York City. Lobsters were also plentiful, providing both food and income for the villagers, who peddled them to mainlanders at about two cents apiece.

The village was abandoned after its harbor was washed away by a hurricane around 1860. It remained uninhabited until 1863 when it was reconstructed and reinhabited until 1876.

A storm in the spring of 1958 carved a wide, shallow channel between Morris Island and Monomoy, separating it from the mainland.  The Blizzard of 1978 further divided the island into North Monomoy and South Monomoy.  A storm during the winter of 2006-2007 once again reconnected South Monomoy to the mainland, although North Monomoy remains an island.  The island was designated a Federal Wildlife Refuge in 1970, serving as an important stop on the migratory routes of 285 species of birds.  Since gaining federal protection in 1972, gray seals have become a common sight on Monomoy and nearby Chatham's South Beach island. Part of the refuge is the Monomoy Wilderness.

Monomoy has no human residents, no electricity, and no paved roads. The only extant reminder of Monomoy's habitation is the Monomoy Point Light, which guided ships from 1828 to 1923. The wooden lightkeeper's quarters, the cast iron light tower, and the brick generator house are on the point of South Monomoy.

The island was taken over by the US government just before World War II. In 1944, the island was home to the Monomoy Island Gunnery Range, mainly used by the US Army Air Forces and other services for bombing and aerial gunnery practice, with the Monomoy National Wildlife Refuge established the same year. The gunnery range was abandoned by 1951, while the wildlife refuge still exists. The former gunnery and bombing range was surveyed under the United States Army Corps of Engineers Formerly Used Defense Sites (FUDS) program for possible unexploded ordnance in 1995. None was found, though the survey noted that similar searches took place in 1950 and 1951, and circa 1965 the wildlife refuge manager at the time found some  practice bombs. By 1995 the former bombing target was under water due to shifting of the island. 

Since 2013, there has been a surge of Atlantic great white shark sightings off the coast of the islands. Some of the sharks have been tagged by the crew of the F/V Ezyduzit.

References

Further reading

External links
  Monomoy Maps, Photos, and News

Chatham, Massachusetts
Coastal islands of Massachusetts
Islands of Barnstable County, Massachusetts